Rashed Al-Majed (born 27 July 1969) is a Saudi singer, actor, musician, and record producer. He has been active since 1984.

Rashed Al-Majed is one of the most famous singers in the Middle East and has released almost 40 records. His songs often have emotional and romantic themes.

He has worked with the Saudi national operetta in Jenadriyah and has recorded with them more than eight times. He has performed numerous concerts in Saudi Arabia, Bahrain, Kuwait, Qatar, Oman, Egypt, Lebanon, Jordan, France, and the United Kingdom.

In addition, he is one of the largest producers in the Middle East, owning the Art Jazeera channel and a 50% stake in Platinum Records with MBC Group.

Early life 

Rashed Almajid was born into a Muslim family on 27 July 1969 in Manama, Bahrain (Saudi father and  Bahraini mother). Almajid was the second born to his parents; he has two brothers and four sisters. Almajid spent most of his childhood in Bahrain and obtained a high school diploma there.

Music career 

Almajid’s career extended more than three decades. Throughout these years, he was able to expand Arabic music and establish a wide fan base throughout the Persian Gulf region and North Africa.

Early life and beginnings 
Almajid’s artistic journey started at the age of 15, specifically when his teacher Hamad Al-Hamad appreciated his talent and predicted a bright future for him. His teacher also wrote many of the melodies of his early songs. Almajid’s first song Hilwa ya al bahrinya (You pretty Bahraini girl) was broadcast through Bahrain TV in the show Bab Asindibad (Sinbads Door).

Almajid’s first public album went to market late 1984 which was called Aah Ya Qalbi (Oh My Heart) while Almajid was still fifteen. The album included five songs of which most were co-produced with his teacher Hamad Al-Hamad. The most famous of these songs was Al-Barha (Yesterday), which was the opening theme of the show Nimr Bin Idwan.

In the year 1986, Almajid released his second album titled Lee Bint Aam. A song from that album with the same title had the biggest success and the best response from fans especially in Arab States of the Persian Gulf.

In the year 1987, Almajid released the album Khal Al-Taghali in the style of Arabian Jalissa where a lot of Oud sounds were used. This year was a very important year in Almajid’s career as it was the first time he was chosen to sing in the Ginadryah festival in Saudi Arabia. His performance lasted 45 minutes and was created and orchestrated by Al-Hamad, who used a lot of folklore and contemporary Arabian melodies.

In 1988 and 1989, Almajid released three albums: one Jalissa style and two studio albums. Some of the most famous hits from these albums include: Jatini Taqoli, Sayyad Al-Ghawani, Qasat Daiaa Abaid, Dai’atni, Wadatni, etc.

In 1990, Almajid released an album entitled, Tal Intithari, which was produced with Tawkeelat co-operation for artistic productions. In the same year, he also released the album Hoob Al-Watan which coincides with the Iraqi Invasion of Kuwait. Hoob Al-Watan (Love of Country) was one of the most praised works of Almajid  and the first album to be released by Aljazeera Arts and Productions (Which Almajid later bought). Then in the year 1992, he released the album called Abshar Min. This album further elevated Almajid's status in the market. Two of the most famous songs of that album were: Ayooni and Ma Yanfa.

The year 1993 was considered to be a turning point for Almajid. He achieved stardom when he released two records that year: Adunya Hathooth and Allah Kareem. Songs from these albums spread vigorously throughout different radio and TV stations as they won many music awards. That same year, Almajid experimented with acting on the set of La Lilzawjat (TV series), but did not receive positive feedback from the viewers. He performed some of his songs in this TV series.

A year later, Almajid's fame was still growing due to his two albums Shartan Athahab and Aghla Habeebah, both released in 1994 and 1995 respectively. The album Shartan Athahab achieved outstanding sales.

In 1996, Almajid released a patriotic themed album entitled: Safwat Malook Al-Arab. The album release coincided with the healing and recovery of King Fahd of Saudi Arabia. For this album, he collaborated with the artist Mohammed Abdu (singer) and the poet Prince Khalid bin Faisal Al Saud.

In the same year, Almajid released the album Al-Musafir, which contained the song Al-Musafir that went viral and conquered the top of most Arab music charts. This album is Almajid's highest selling album; it is estimated at about one million copies sold. Some of the notable songs of that album include: Sawlifak, Weinak Habibi, Wahshtni, Tafnan, Ash Min Shafak, Al-Mahba, etc.

In late 1997 and early 1998, Almajid released two new records: Asaudia (for the celebration of the Saudi football team reaching the World Cup) and Tadhak Adunya. Both albums received excellent feedback and success.

Between 1999 and 2001, Almajid released another two albums: Ala Min Tilab and Waily. The most distinct characteristic of Almajid music between 1997 and 2001 was the supervision of Mishal Al-Oroj and the co-production with Tarek Al-Akaf.

2002–2006: The Emarati colour and private songs 

In 2002, Almajid released the album Mashkalni which sparked a lot of media attention, mainly due to the new direction Almajid was taking by adding a very distinct Emirati flavour to his songs. Hussain Al Jasmi (singer) helped in the composition of the album's title song Mashkalni. During that period, Almajid became very publicly active and went on many talk shows and interviews which allowed him to gain even more momentum in his new found style. It is worth noting that Emirati style music was not very widespread when Almajid incorporated it into his music. The most notable TV show Almajid went on was The Lebanese show Khaleik Fi Al-Bait, hosted by Zahi Wahbi.

In the year 2003, Almajid released the Iraqi-influenced song Ayoon within the album Hadaya. This song topped many Arab music charts even though the music video (which had the cost of $120 thousand USD) received criticism in the media.

From 2003 onwards, Almajid stayed away from releasing studio albums and was content with releasing singles, mostly with an Emirati influence. He also had and continues to collaborate with singer/producer Faiz Asaed and the poet Sheikh Hamdan bin Mohammed bin Rashid al Maktoum.

Studio albums  

1985  : Ah Ya Qalbi  
1986  : Lee Bint Aam 
1987  : Khal Ataghli 
1988  : Qasat Daia Abaid 
1988  : Awal Abi Qurbak 
1989  : Ya Mlieh 
1990  :  Hob Al-Watan 
1990  :  Tal intithari 
1991  :  Abshar Min Ayooni 
1992  :  Ya Subhan 
1992  :  Adunya Hathoth 
1993  :  Allah Kareem 
1994  :  Shartan Athhab 
1995  :  Aghla Habiba 
1996  :  Al-Musafir 
1996  :  Safwat Malook Al-Arab 
1997  :  Haflat Paris 
1998  :  Shamat Hayati 
1998  :  Asoudia 
1998  :  Tidhak Adunya 
1999  :  Ala Min Tilabha 
2001  :  Waili 
2002  :  Mashkalni 
2003  :  Al-Hadaia 
2005  :  Alhal alsaab 
2007  :  Salamat
2009  :  Noor ayni
2013  : Moseeba

Music videos  

1993  : Ashki 
1992  :  Adunya Hathoth  
1994  :  Allah Yejeebak 
1994  :  Rajwai 
1994  :  AlQamra 
1994  :  Faman Allah Ya Al-Musafir 
1994  :  Serak Mai 
1995  :  Aghla Habiba 
1994  :  Al-Musafir 
1996  :  Habibi Maya 
1996  :  Washtni 
1996  :  Al-Maabha 
1996  :  Ya Ainha 
1998  :  La Ja’a Waqat Al-Jad 
1998  :  Ya Nasina 
1998  :  Ya Rashad 
2002  :  Waily 
2002  :  Mashkalni 
2003  :  Al-Ayoon 
2005  :  Nasinakum 
2006  :  Afnak 
2007  :  Sahi Lihum 
2009  :  Gaza

References

External links 

1969 births
Living people
People from Dammam
20th-century Saudi Arabian male singers
Saudi Arabian expatriates in Bahrain
Saudi Arabian expatriates in the United Arab Emirates
Saudi Arabian people of Bahraini descent
MTV Europe Music Award winners
21st-century Saudi Arabian male singers
Saudi Arabian male film actors
Saudi Arabian male television actors